Roodepoort is a town in the Gauteng province of South Africa. Formerly an independent municipality, Roodepoort became part of the Johannesburg municipality in the late 1990s, along with Randburg and Sandton. Johannesburg's most famous botanical garden, Witwatersrand National Botanical Gardens (now renamed Walter Sisulu National Botanical Garden), is located in Roodepoort.

History
In 1884, brothers Fred and Harry Struben, having discovered gold on the farm Wilgespruit at the western end of the Witwatersrand, were granted concessions to mine the area. When George Harrison's find at Langlaagte came to light and gold fever took hold, the Strubens brothers were joined by a swarm of gold diggers. Other areas such as Maraisburg were prospected and mined by A.P. Marais and at Florida, the owners were van der Hoven, Bantjies and Lys. Though the Struben brothers' Confidence Reef bore little gold and their mine was unprofitable, the ramshackle town that grew around it became the Roodepoort Municipality in 1904. Incorporating the towns of Hamburg, Florida and Maraisburg, Roodepoort became a city in 1977, and has since developed as one of Johannesburg's most prominently-Afrikaans (language of Dutch origin) speaking districts.

Ethnicity
Traditionally, Roodeport was an Afrikaans-speaking area, but after apartheid, the area has attracted different ethnic groups and the dominant language is now English. The rapid expansion of middle-class housing in the area has caused an influx of all ethnic groups, most of whom are middle class.

Economy

Retail

Roodepoort has seen large population growth due to Johannesburg urban sprawl. There are two major malls in the area - Clearwater Mall, the most upscale in Roodepoort and Westgate Mall the largest and oldest. Areas of interest for entertainment include the Featherbrooke Village centre which is close to the old Monash University (now the IIE MSA) and is a student hotspot. Also found in the area is the Hillfox Centre and the Strubens Valley strip malls, both are large retail centres.

Roodepoort has a wide variety of restaurants and shopping centres. The CBD of the city has shifted from its historical center to a location adjacent to the N1 Highway & 14th Avenue interchange in Constantia Kloof. Regional headquarters of banks, a large hospital, various office parks and two large hotels are found in the new CBD. Roodepoort still has a large industrial sector along Main Reef Road (R41).  A number of logistical firms work from the area as well as other light industry.

Sport
The city has a large golf course called Ruimsig Country Club in the suburb Ruimsig. Another smaller golf course is the Jackel Creek Golf Estate. In between the two, there is a links golf course Eagle Canyon. Further south in Roodepoort there's a golf course called CMR Golf Club. Roodepoort Athletics Stadium is also found within the city. It has three mega private gym facilities owned by Virgin Active and Planet Fitness.

Parks and greenspace
The Roodepoort area has numerous parks and green areas. Walter Sisulu National Botanical Garden, formerly known as the Witwatersrand National Botanical Garden, is a 300 hectares (3.0 km2) botanical reserve with grass parks, natural cliff face and waterfall. Another large greenspace is the Kloofendal Nature Reserve, a 128ha park with trails, amphitheatre, dam and small wild mammals. Further to the south is Florida Lake with its bird life and related aquatic activities.

Law and government

Government
Although Roodepoort has traditionally been regarded as being part of the West Rand, it was not made part of the West Rand District Municipality, instead being integrated into the City of Johannesburg Metropolitan Municipality, following the post-apartheid re-organisation of local government in the late 1990s.

Education

Schools
Roodepoort is home to several private and state schools, including Ruimsig Montessori International School, Crawford International, Trinity House, Charter College, Allen Glen High School, West Ridge High School, Horizon View Primary, Ridgevale Primary School, Hoërskool Roodepoort, Hoërskool Die Adelaar, The Kings School West Rand and Ruimsig Academy.

University
In 2001, Monash University Australia opened a campus in Roodepoort called Monash South Africa (MSA). The university pulled out of South Africa in 2018 but sold the university to the Independent Institute of Education.  Monash South Africa is now the IIE MSA offering the same qualifications as the old Monash University.

References

External links

West Rand
Johannesburg Region C
1884 establishments in the South African Republic